John Hamilton Davidson (born December 13, 1941) is an American actor, singer, and game-show host known for hosting That's Incredible!, Time Machine, and Hollywood Squares in the 1980s, and a revival of The $100,000 Pyramid in 1991.

Biography
Davidson was born to two Baptist ministers in Pittsburgh, Pennsylvania, lived in West Bridgewater, Massachusetts, and graduated from White Plains High School (in White Plains, New York), before entering Denison University. He thought about following in his parents' footsteps, but ultimately decided that he would rather sing about love than preach it.

Davidson worked in television programs including sitcoms, game shows, variety shows, and talk shows. He appeared in the Hallmark Hall of Fame presentation of The Fantastiks in 1964 (with Ricardo Montalbán and Susan Watson). In the summer of 1966, he was the host to two prime-time variety hours titled The Kraft Summer Music Hall and The John Davidson Show (which included George Carlin and Richard Pryor). 

As the 1980s began, he became well known for hosting, alongside Fran Tarkenton and Cathy Lee Crosby, That's Incredible! (1980–84), a human-interest/stunt-themed series whose creation, by Alan Landsburg, followed in the tradition of the 1950s television show You Asked for It.

Career
Davidson made his film debut in The Happiest Millionaire, released in 1967, alongside Lesley Ann Warren and Fred MacMurray. That same year, he appeared as a guest singer on The Carol Burnett Show (Season One, Episode 13).  The next year saw Warren and Davidson co-star again in The One and Only, Genuine, Original Family Band.  In 1969, Davidson was the mystery guest on What's My Line? with host Wally Bruner. Davidson's career was managed by Alan Bernard, former manager of Andy Williams and one of the B's from BNB, the largest personal management firm in the 1970s.

During an appearance on the game show Scrabble in 1987, he told the national television audience that he appeared as an underwear model in the 1959 Sears catalog; he would have been 17 at the time. He made his Broadway debut in the 1964 production of Foxy, which starred Bert Lahr. He also appeared in State Fair in 1996.

He was a member of the regular repertory company on the short-lived CBS variety show The Entertainers (1964–65). He made more than a hundred appearances on the original Hollywood Squares during its 1966–81 run. He was a regular player on many anthology and variety series of the 1970s–80s, including The Ed Sullivan Show, The Sonny & Cher Comedy Hour, Love American Style (S2E09 "Love and the Young Executive" 1970 Nov 20), The Love Boat, Fantasy Island, and Spenser: For Hire.

Davidson made numerous appearances on the original Hollywood Squares, from the game show's 1966 premiere to its 1981 cancellation, and he was there known for his long-winded bluffs. None of the comparatively minor celebrities who were guests of producers Merrill Heatter and Robert "Bob" Quigley were more convincing at getting contestants to believe his (often ridiculous) answers to questions the program's "Square-Master", or host, entertainer Peter Marshall, posed. Most times, Marshall could barely conceal a grin as Davidson started in on some far-fetched but plausible explanations for his answers, often prefaced with something to the effect of: "I just read about it in the New England Journal of Medicine, it was a fascinating study, and it said that..." Davidson sold these preposterous stories with such sincerity that contestants were often duped more than once in the same show.

In 1973 and 1974, he starred alongside Sally Field on the situation comedy The Girl with Something Extra. (The "something extra" Field's character had was telepathy.) In 1974 he guest-starred on the television series The Streets of San Francisco, in the episode "Mask of Death", portraying a cross-dressing lounge singer who murders his/her fans. In the episode, Davidson sings in drag while impersonating such notables as Carol Channing, singing "Diamonds Are a Girl's Best Friend". Also in 1974, the singer posed near-nude (with a strategically placed towel) for the magazine Cosmopolitan.

In 1977, Davidson was present at the Beverly Hills Supper Club fire in Southgate, Kentucky. He was expected to appear onstage as the headline act the evening the fire broke out, killing 165. Davidson helped others escape before fleeing through a back door. Davidson's music director, Douglas Herro, was among the victims. Davidson was not injured and later participated in a charity concert to raise funds for the families of fire victims.

In the late 1970s, the actor became one of four regular guest hosts (along with Joey Bishop, McLean Stevenson, and Joan Rivers) on The Tonight Show Starring Johnny Carson, and hosted the show 87 times. In the early 1980s he hosted his own talk show, produced by Westinghouse Broadcasting/Group W, after it canceled The Mike Douglas Show. Davidson's show aired daily in syndication from 1980 to 1982. In 1985, he hosted the NBC daytime game show Time Machine.

Davidson worked with real estate promoter Dave Del Dotto’s paid programs during the late 1980s and early 1990s, which were notable for taking place in outdoor, scenic settings (such as Hawaii), and for having the actor as host. These "infomercials", as they have come to be called, often appeared on late night television and were a staple for years on many cable channels till the FCC filed a complaint against Del Dotto in 1995, alleging that in his paid programs, Del Dotto had "made false and unsubstantiated representations."
   
Davidson hosted a revival of Hollywood Squares, whose announcer, Shadoe Stevens, in time also became a regular "square," which ran from 1986 to 1989. In addition, he hosted a 170-episode revival of The $100,000 Pyramid in 1991. Davidson also appeared as a featured guest on The Carpenters' television specials Space Encounters (1977) and Music! Music! Music! (1980).  Following his three-year run on 
Hollywood Squares, he was one of six people who auditioned to host the CBS daytime version of Wheel of Fortune; however, Bob Goen was hired instead.

Recording career
In the 1960s, Davidson was a successful recording artist. He recorded 12 albums in the '60s and '70s. From 1966 to 1971, he recorded for Columbia Records, where he enjoyed his greatest success. Five of his albums reached the Billboard 200 album charts, with 1966's "The Time of My Life!" peaking at No. 19. His albums usually consisted of covers of recent hit singles along with some new material.

As a singles artist, he placed seven records on the Adult Contemporary chart. "Everytime I Sing a Love Song", released in 1976, peaked at No. 7, his most successful single.

Discography

Film career
Davidson acted in many movies including The Happiest Millionaire (1967), The One and Only, Genuine, Original Family Band (1968), Coffee, Tea, or Me (1973), The Concorde ... Airport '79 (1979), Dallas Cowboy Cheerleaders II, (1980) and Edward Scissorhands (1990).

Stage work
Davidson has appeared in productions of A Funny Thing Happened on the Way to the Forum, Kismet, State Fair, Man of La Mancha, Chicago, and The Will Rogers Follies, at the Surflight Theatre in Long Beach Island, New Jersey. He has also performed the autobiographical play Father/Son and Holy Ghost, about his relationship with his father, who was a minister.

In July 1991 Davidson appeared in summer stock with Sacramento Music Circus of Sacramento, California, in The Music Man alongside Susan Watson, Richard Paul, Carol Swarbrick, and the Delta Music Society Quartet of Sacramento.

Davidson performed daily in 1993–94 in Branson at a theater bearing his name.

In late 2011 Davidson was listed as a guest star with The Fabulous Palm Springs Follies at the Plaza Theatre in Palm Springs, California.

In June 2012 Davidson took on the role of Henry in the off-Broadway revival of The Fantasticks. In April 2013 he took on the role of the Wizard in the first North American tour of Wicked. In 2016, Davidson played Norman Thayer in On Golden Pond at Judson Theatre Company.  In June 2017, he took on the role of Charles Frohman/Captain James Hook in the North American tour of Finding Neverland.

Personal life
Davidson's first marriage was to Jackie Miller. He has two children (John Davidson, Jr., who often appeared with his father on later versions of Hollywood Squares, and Jennifer (Davidson) Kane.  Since 1983 Davidson has been married to former backup singer Rhonda Rivera, and they have a daughter Ashleigh Davidson. They live primarily in Tamworth, New Hampshire.

The son of two Baptist ministers, Davidson now identifies as an atheist, declaring himself "openly secular" in a video for the Openly Secular Coalition begun by the Richard Dawkins Foundation for Reason and Science, the Secular Coalition for America, and other humanist groups.

References

Sources
 Dorff, Steve  "What Went Wrong?, Episode 9: Interview with John Davidson", WorldPress.com, January 4, 2009; accessed February 28, 2012.

External links
 
 
 
 
 John Davidson Website

1941 births
Living people
20th-century American male actors
20th-century American singers
American atheists
American expatriates in Mexico
American game show hosts
American male film actors
American male stage actors
American male television actors
Colpix Records artists
Columbia Records artists
Denison University alumni
Male actors from Pittsburgh
Mercury Records artists
People from South Orange, New Jersey
Singers from Pennsylvania
Westinghouse Broadcasting